Melky is a unisex given name. Notable people with the name include:

Melky Cabrera (born 1984), Dominican baseball player
Melky Goeslaw (1947–2006), Indonesian singer and boxing manager
Melky Mesa (born 1987), Dominican baseball player
Melky Ndokomandji (born 1997), Central African footballer
Melky Jean, singer, half of the Haitian-American R&B hip hop duo Melky Sedeck;, sister of Wyclef Jean